Inghirami is a lunar impact crater that is located toward the southwestern limb of the Moon. It lies to the southwest of the large walled plain Schickard. Northwest of Inghirami is the wide Vallis Inghirami, a wide, straight valley that is radial to the Mare Orientale impact basin. The valley has a length of about 140 kilometers and ends at the northern edge of the crater.

Inghirami is located near the southeastern edge of the immense skirt of ejecta that surrounds the Mare Orientale. This material has formed linear ridges and valleys that continue across most of the crater rim and interior from the northwestern face. Much of the outer rim has been modified by this impact material, and the most intact part of the rim lies along the southeast edge.

The partly buried rim of this crater is roughly circular and somewhat irregular. There are some shelves and terraces along the sides, but these features are moderately eroded. A few small craters lie along or near the rim. The most notable crater on the interior floor is a small impact beside the eastern inner wall. The interior floor retains its ridges, streaky appearance across much of the crater, with only an area by the eastern rim being relatively flat and featureless.

Inghirami lies to the east of the Mendel-Rydberg Basin, a 630 km wide impact basin of Nectarian age.

Satellite craters
By convention these features are identified on lunar maps by placing the letter on the side of the crater midpoint that is closest to Inghirami.

See also
 Inghirami Valley

References

 
 
 
 
 
 
 
 
 
 
 
 

Impact craters on the Moon